Weekend in London is the fifth studio album by the English rock band the Dave Clark Five. It contains the single "Come Home" and covers of "Blue Suede Shoes" by Carl Perkins and "Little Bitty Pretty One" by Thurston Harris. The album also features "Hurting Inside" and Till the Right One Comes Along", both of which later appeared on The Dave Clark Five (1971) compilation album. In Canada, it was released as Encores on Capitol Records.

Reception 

In his retrospective review for AllMusic, Greg Adams said the band's own songs on Weekend in London "vacillate between the pretty Beatlesque pop of 'Your Turn to Cry' and moody rockers similar to early Zombies" and that as the band released three albums around that time, "Weekend in London sounds like they were being stretched a little too thin."

Track listing 
All tracks written by Dave Clark and Mike Smith, except were noted.

Side one 
"Come Home" – 2:49
"We'll Be Running" (Dave Clark, Denis Payton) – 1:32
"Blue Suede Shoes" (Carl Perkins) – 1:44
"Hurting Inside" – 2:37
"I'll Never Know" (Dave Clark, Denis Payton) – 1:45
Til the Right One Comes Along" – 2:11

Side two 
"I'm Thinking" (Dave Clark, Denis Payton) – 1:29
"Your Turn to Cry" – 3:12 
"Little Bitty Pretty One" (Robert James Byrd) – 1:30
"Remember it's Me" – 2:19
"Mighty Good Loving" (Dave Clark, Lenny Davidson) – 2:40

Personnel
The Dave Clark Five
Dave Clark - drums, backing vocals
Mike Smith - keyboards, lead vocals
Lenny Davidson - guitars, backing vocals and harmony vocals 
Rick Huxley - bass guitar, backing vocals 
Denis Payton - saxophone, harmonica, backing vocals
Technical
Jay Thompson - cover photography

Charts

References 

The Dave Clark Five albums
1965 albums
Epic Records albums